Moitheri Ngwenya Ntobo (born 14 November 1979) is a Mosotho former professional footballer who last played for Lesotho Correctional Services.

International career
He has won 14 caps for the Lesotho national football team since 2005.

External links
 

Association football defenders
Lesotho footballers
Lesotho international footballers
1979 births
Living people
US Monastir (football) players
Expatriate footballers in Tunisia
Expatriate footballers in Senegal
Expatriate footballers in Egypt
Expatriate footballers in Namibia
Expatriate footballers in Saudi Arabia
Lesotho expatriate sportspeople in Namibia
Lesotho expatriate footballers
F.C. Civics Windhoek players
Lesotho Correctional Services players
AS Douanes (Senegal) players
Wadi Degla SC players
Ittihad FC players
Saudi Professional League players